Shaolin Temple is a Shaw Brothers del 1975 film directed by Chang Cheh. It is one of the Shaolin Temple themed martial arts films and concerns their rebellion against the Qings, with an all-star cast featuring the second and third generations of Chang Cheh's stable of actors including David Chiang, Ti Lung, Alexander Fu Sheng and Chi Kuan Chun, as well as cameo appearances by several of the actors that would later become collectively known as the Venoms mob. The film serves as a pseudo prequel to Five Shaolin Masters.

Plot
The film opens with the chief Shaolin Monks realizing that time is not on their side and they must train more fighters to fight the Qings. The monk Hai Hsien (Shan Mao) opposes this as he is secretly working for the court. Outside many men are sitting in front of the temple waiting to be accepted in, Fang Shih Yu (Alexander Fu Sheng), Ma Chao-hsing (Tony Liu) and others, as the temple tests the will of potential students by making them wait outside for days, eventually the two are accepted in for "training". Fang Shih Yu becomes frustrated immediately as Shaolin methods of teaching martial arts are rather obscure, although Ma Chao-hsing begins learning the five animal styles from the start.

Elsewhere, escaped Ming soldiers Tsai Te-cheng (Ti Lung), Hu Te-ti (David Chiang), Yen Yung-chun (Szu Shih), and Ma Fu Yi (Wang Lung Wei) arrive close to Shaolin looking for a place to hide from the Qing. Hu Te-ti suggests they go to Shaolin and they are instantly accepted, which frustrates three more students trying to get acceptance into the temple, Lin Kwong Yao (Kuo Chui), Huang Sung Han (Lee I Min), and Hu Hui Chien (Kuan-Chun Chi). The three are eventually accepted and begin their obscure training. Tsai Te-cheng learns the wing chun style from a strange female monk and Hu Te-ti learns the iron whip. This forces Hai Hsein to secretly go to the court and report to Prince Hoo (Lu Feng) that Shaolin has been training new fighters.

The Qing scheme to destroy Shaolin. Hai Hsein returns to Shaolin looking to recruit more traitors to set up the temple for a raid. All the accepted students become close friends and proficient in their kung fu, except for Fang Shih Yu (who is unknowingly learning tiger boxing but is impatient). He keeps getting into fights with Ma Fu Yi, who is disgruntled with being at Shaolin. A mysterious figure at night (perhaps his friend Ma Chao-sing) begins teaching Fang Shih Yu the tiger-crane style and he defeats Ma Fu Yi in a friendly spar. This sparks the curiosity of Hai Hsein as he takes Ma Fu Yi under his wing and recruits him as a traitor. Things begin to go sour at the temple due to the treachery of Hai Hsein and Ma Fu Yi and it is eventually attacked by thousands of Qing soldiers, and an all-out battle occurs at Shaolin Temple with only eight Shaolin devotees escaping the ensuing massacre.

Cast
 David Chiang – Hu Te-Ti
 Ti Lung – Tsai Te-Cheng 
 Yueh Hua – Li Se Kai 
 Wang Chung – Fang Ta Hung 
 Tony Liu – Ma Chao-Hsing 
 Wang Lung Wei – Ma Fu Yi
 Alexander Fu Sheng – Fang Shih-Yu (Fong Sai-yuk)
 Kuan Chun Chi – Hu Hui Chien 
 Frankie Wei Hung – Hung Hsi-Kuan
 Kuo Chui – Lin Kwong-Yao
 Lee Yi-Min – Huang Sung Han 
 Tang Yen-Tsan – Chu Tao
 Shan Mao – Shaolin monk Hai Hsein
 Chiang Sheng – Shaolin monk Man Yue
 Shih Szu – Yen Yung-Chun
 Ku Feng – King Man Kuei
 Lu Feng – General Hu Pei-Chi 
 Tsai Hung – General Ching
 Wong Ching – General Shin
 Lo Mang – Junior monk 
 Wei Pai – Junior monk (slain by Manchu archers)

References

External links
 
 

1976 films
1976 action films
1976 martial arts films
Films directed by Chang Cheh
Films set in 18th-century Qing dynasty
Hong Kong action films
Hong Kong martial arts films
Kung fu films
1970s Mandarin-language films
Prequel films
Shaw Brothers Studio films
Hong Kong prequel films
1970s Hong Kong films